Qusay (also transliterated as Qusai) is a masculine given name. It may refer to:

People
 Qusai Abu Alieh, Jordanian footballer
 Qusai Abtini, Syrian child actor
 Ahmed Kousay Altaie, Iraqi American United States Army soldier, captured in Baghdad
 Qusay Habib, Syrian footballer
 Qusay Hussein, Iraqi businessman and politician, second son of Saddam Hussein
 Qusai ibn Kilab, Quraishi king of Mecca, ancestor of Hashemites (Muhammad)
 Qusay Munir, Iraqi footballer
 Qusay Salahaddin, Iraqi student union leader, assassinated in 2005
 Qusai (musician) (born Qusai Kheder), Saudi Arabian rapper/record producer
 Michel Qissi, Moroccan-Belgian actor
 Qusay al-Shaykh Askar, Iraqi-Danish novelist, poet and literary scholar.

Arabic masculine given names